Henrik Petré (born April 9, 1979) is a Swedish B.Sc. in sports science and former professional ice hockey player who played with HC Slovan Bratislava in the Slovak Extraliga. He was selected by the Washington Capitals in the 6th round (143 overall) of the 1997 NHL Entry Draft.

After his player career, Petré has been active as a strength and conditioning coach for Swedish players of several NHL teams, and from 2015–2017 he was head of education at flywheel training equipment developer Exxentric, known for the kBox.

References

External links

1979 births
Djurgårdens IF Hockey players
HC Slovan Bratislava players
Living people
Swedish ice hockey defencemen
Washington Capitals draft picks
Swedish expatriate ice hockey players in Finland
Swedish expatriate sportspeople in Slovakia
Swedish expatriate sportspeople in Slovenia
Swedish expatriate sportspeople in Kazakhstan
Expatriate ice hockey players in Slovakia
Expatriate ice hockey players in Slovenia
Expatriate ice hockey players in Kazakhstan
Ice hockey people from Stockholm